Bánh rán is a deep-fried glutinous rice ball Vietnamese dish from northern Vietnam. In Vietnamese, bánh is a category of food including cakes, pies, and pastries, while rán means "fried."

Its outer shell is made from glutinous rice flour, and covered all over with white sesame seeds. Its filling is made from sweetened mung bean paste, and scented with jasmine flower essence. Traditionally, the filling should be separated from the shell so that if one shakes the bánh rán, one can feel the filling rattle against the inside of the shell.

In southern Vietnam, a similar dish, called bánh cam, is nearly identical to bánh rán, but does not contain jasmine essence. A further difference is that for bánh cam the filling does not need to be separated from the shell. In Southern Vietnam, bánh cam is different from bánh rán as the Northern version is traditionally eaten with a sugary syrup that is poured over the pastry.

The Northern "bánh rán" usually consists of: minced pork, wood-ear mushroom, dry vermicelli, carrot, salt and pepper. This mixture then blend with raw egg to create a soft, salty filling. It usually serves with sweet and sour chili sauce with sliced radish/papaya.

Bánh rán is also the Vietnamese translation of the Japanese confection dorayaki, made famous internationally by the manga Doraemon.

See also

 Chapssal doughnut
 Zin dou
 List of deep fried foods

References

External links

Recipe & History: How To Make Bánh Cam / Bánh Ran
Article about bánh rán and bánh cam
Alice's Guide to Vietnamese Banh

Vietnamese pastries
Vietnamese words and phrases
Deep fried foods
Stuffed desserts
Bánh